Fairhaven Station, also called Bellingham, is a train station serving Amtrak's Cascades route, as well as a bus station serving Greyhound Lines and local Whatcom Transportation Authority buses, in Bellingham, Washington, United States. Built in 1995, the station is located near the Bellingham Cruise Terminal, the southern connection for the Alaska Marine Highway.  Water Taxi services and seasonal whale watching excursions also provide connections from the Bellingham Cruise Terminal to the San Juan Islands.

Fairhaven Station is owned by the Port of Bellingham and is the last northbound stop in the United States on the Amtrak Cascades route before it enters Canada. (Passengers clear Canadian customs in Vancouver, so northbound trains do not stop at the border.)

Boardings and alightings

References

External links

Amtrak stations in Washington (state)
Bus stations in Washington (state)
Buildings and structures in Bellingham, Washington
Railway stations in the United States opened in 1995
Transportation buildings and structures in Whatcom County, Washington